The Indian Political Department (IPD), formerly known as the Foreign and Political Department of the Government of India, was a government department in British India. It originated in a resolution passed on 13 September 1783 by the board of directors of the East India Company; this decreed the creation of a department which could help “relieve the pressure” on the administration of Warren Hastings in conducting its "secret and political business".

In 1843, Governor-General Ellenborough reformed the administration,
organizing Secretariat of the Government into four departments – Foreign, Home, Finance and Military. The officer in charge of the foreign department was supposed to manage the "conduct of all correspondence belonging to the external and internal diplomatic relations of the government".  Its political officers were responsible for the civil administration of frontier districts, and also served as British agents to rulers of Princely states.  A distinction was made between the "foreign" and "political" functions of the department; relations with all "Asiatic powers" (including native princely states of India) were treated as "political" and those with all European powers as "foreign".  At independence in 1948, the Foreign and Political department of the British India government was transformed into the new Ministry of External Affairs and Commonwealth Relations. A small number of British officers continued to serve as employees of the Government of India.

Staff
The staff employed by the IPD, known as the Indian Political Service, were generally referred to as political officers, or colloquially as "politicals", and were recruited from four areas: 
 Two thirds were recruited from the Indian Army
 Next most numerous were those recruited from the Indian Civil Service
 Some came from the Indian Medical Service
 Some came from the Indian Public Works and Engineering Department
 Some came from the Law Services 

All members of the IPS were seconded from their original service and were subject to their original service's pension and retirement rules. The IPS was allowed to recruit two ICS officers every year, which was reduced to one every fifth year. On the Army side, four or five Indian Army officers were recruited on alternate years. When the process of Indianisation reached the IPS, some were also recruited from the Provincial Civil Services and services connected with the frontier.

Employees of the political service were predominantly European, although small numbers of Indians were employed. In 1947 it had a staff of 170 officers, of which 124 were serving. They included 17 Indians, of which 12 were Muslim, four Hindus and one Sikh.

References

Government of British India
1783 establishments in British India
Indian Civil Service
Military of British India